Nicole Colombi (born 29 December 1995) is an Italian racewalker, who won a silver medal with the Italian team at the 2018 IAAF World Race Walking Team Championships.

National records
 50 km walk (road): 4:27:38 ( Gioiosa Marea, 27 January 2019) - till 19 May 2019

Achievements

National titles
 Italian Athletics Championships
 50 km walk: 2019
 10 km walk: 2021

See also
 Italy at the IAAF World Race Walking Cup
 Italy at the European Race Walking Cup

References

External links
 

1995 births
Living people
Italian female racewalkers
World Athletics Championships athletes for Italy
20th-century Italian women
21st-century Italian women